Elizabeth Ibanda-Nahamya was a Ugandan lawyer and judge, who, on 22 March 2018, was appointed Judge of the Mechanism for International Criminal Tribunals (MICT). The appointment by António Guterres, the Secretary General of the United Nations, was in replacement to the MICT, following the resignation of Judge Solomy Balungi Bossa, who was elected to the International Criminal Court. Before that, she sat on the High Court of Uganda, where she was assigned to the International Crimes Division of that court.

Background and education
She graduated from the Faculty of Law of Makerere University, Uganda's largest and oldest public university, with a Bachelor of Laws. She then obtained a Diploma in Legal Practice by the Law Development Centre in Kampala, Uganda's capital city. She also holds a Master of Laws from the University of New Haven, in the West Haven, Connecticut, United States. She has undertaken several postgraduate courses, including one at the International Development Law Organization, in Rome, Italy in 1992.

Career
During the process of creating Uganda's 1995 Constitution, Ibanda-Nahamya was a researcher for the Constituent Assembly. She also served as a legal adviser to the Constituent Assembly Women Caucus. She also worked as researcher at the Uganda Ministry of Justice and Constitutional Affairs, where she participated in drafting of the Parliamentary Election Bill and the Presidential Election Bill. In 1993, se served as a legal consultant at the Uganda Ministry of Finance.

She has served as a judge on the Special Court for Sierra Leone, from 2004 until 2008 and the International Criminal Tribunal for Rwanda, from 1996 until 2004.

Justice Nahamya has also lectured at Ahmadu Bello University, in Zaria, Nigeria and at the National University of Lesotho, in Maseru, Lesotho. She has also consulted with the World Bank and the Commonwealth Secretariat.

See also
Julia Sebutinde
Monica Mugenyi
Catherine Bamugemereire

References

External links
Announcement of appointment at the International Residual Mechanism for Criminal Tribunals website

20th-century Ugandan lawyers
21st-century Ugandan judges
Year of birth missing (living people)
Living people
Ugandan women lawyers
Ugandan women judges
Makerere University alumni
Law Development Centre alumni
University of New Haven alumni
People from Western Region, Uganda
Justices of the High Court of Uganda
International Court of Justice judges
Ugandan judges of international courts and tribunals
Ugandan judges of United Nations courts and tribunals
21st-century women judges